Lemwerder is a municipality in the district of Wesermarsch, in Lower Saxony, Germany.

Since April 2001, Lemwerder is governed by Mayor Christina Winkelmann.

The shipbuilding companies Lürssen and Abeking & Rasmussen both have shipyards in Lemwerder that specialise in the construction of superyachts.

People 
 Friedrich Lürssen (1851–1916), German shipbuilder, company founder and entrepreneur
 Carl Röver (1889–1942), German Nazi Party official

References

Wesermarsch